Gregor and the Marks of Secret is a high fantasy/epic fantasy novel, the fourth book in the critically acclaimed The Underland Chronicles by Suzanne Collins. It picks up soon after the end of Gregor and the Curse of the Warmbloods.

Plot summary
The novel opens with Gregor's little sister Lizzie preparing to go to camp, while Gregor and Boots head down to the Underland. Ripred introduces Gregor to the now-teenaged Pearlpelt so Gregor can observe "the Bane's" violent instability, and choose to kill him before he ends up in a leadership position. Gregor is uncomfortable with the idea. The next day, he returns to dissuade Ripred, but is instead attacked by the Bane's friends.

After several more weeks, Ripred is still missing, but Gregor remains relaxed until a messenger unexpectedly delivers Luxa her crown. Luxa and her friends know that this is a distress call from the nibbler colony in the Jungle. They investigate, but discover only a deceased mouse and an abandoned colony. Luxa is distraught, and decides to visit the nibblers' other colony at the Fount, under the pretense of going on a picnic date. This ruse leads to several others coming along as well. The group finds the colony mysteriously deserted, though they do discover a "mark of secret" which Hazard says warns of death and sorrow. The traveling party tracks the mice into the Swag, but are forced into Hades Hall by an earthquake. During their journey back to Regalia, they learn the Bane has been systematically executing nibblers, which leads Luxa to declare war against all gnawers. Gregor becomes annoyed with Luxa as the consequences of her actions become apparent.

The team eventually locates the missing nibblers, trapped by rats in a natural gas chamber, and is shocked to discover an Underland children's song describes the scene perfectly (and is thus yet another of Bartholomew of Sandwich's dreadful prophecies). A volcano starts to erupt nearby, and all rush to escape. Though one of their number dies in the explosion, the group travels sadly on until they exit the Firelands. Once there, they part ways: Gregor, Ares, and Temp going to escort the young and injured back to Regalia and spread the news of the rats' plans; the rest returning to protect and mobilize any remaining nibblers. Gregor wants to join the latter group, but Ripred convinces him to go learn about the "Prophecy of Time" and finally claim Sandwich's sword. Ripred also helps Gregor realize his new romantic feelings for Luxa, which have kept him moody and confused during their entire journey. The novel ends with Gregor accepting his role as Sandwich's "warrior" by claiming his sword, and training for war.

The Prophecy of Secret
The prophecy in this book is carved into the walls of an old nursery in the Regalian Palace. The Underlanders take it for a popular nursery rhyme of sorts, like Hey Diddle Diddle or Humpty Dumpty. Underland children sing and dance to it at parties, as Gregor discovers in the early chapters of the novel. The song's "true" meaning is unknown until the mass death of a group of nibblers, when Boots's dancing mimics the terrifying scene perfectly. It was dubbed the "Prophecy of Secret" by Aurora.

Dancing in the firelight, 
See the queen who conquers night.
Gold flows from her, hot and bright.

Meaning: During this part of the children's song, dancers select one girl to be "the queen" and dance in the center of their circle. When the quest members assign it a different meaning, they decide this verse talks about a large volcano, and the light it gives off in the dark tunnels.

Father, mother, sister, brother,
Off they go
I do not know
If we will see another

Meaning: This section is repeated at the end of every verse, and refers to the fact that entire families of nibblers are being executed by the gnawers. As the rats hope to exterminate the mice once and for all, it is truly unlikely that anyone will ever "see another"

Catch the nibblers in a trap.
Watch the nibblers spin and snap.
Quiet while they take a nap.

Meaning: The nibblers are being herded into a pit at the base of the volcano, which is spewing some form of asphyxiant or toxic gas. As the gas (which is denser than air) is blown towards the mice by the currents, it settles into the pit and is breathed in by the nibblers. They start to writhe on the ground in search of clean air, and finally grow still as they are suffocated and die. The mice appear to be napping (according to Boots), which is one of the first clues that leads the quest group to reinterpret this children's song.

Now the guests are at our door
Greet them as we have before.
Some will slice and some will pour.

Meaning: The final verse was once taken as a description of a tea party, and was accompanied by dance moves miming slicing cake and pouring tea. Once the quest groups "translate" the lines, they are taken to describe the war with the gnawers that Luxa has recently initiated. The Regalians are fully prepared to resume hostilities "as [they] have before". Luxa explains to Gregor that, in times of war, the Regalians attack their enemies with swords and burning oil poured from high places.

Characters

Quest members
 Gregor: The twelve-year-old protagonist of the novel; a "rager" and the Regalians' "warrior". He is bonded to the flier Ares and is a close friend of the princess Luxa. The knowledge that he will soon be leaving the Underland forever causes him to conflict with many of his friends, when they act as though he will never leave.
 Ares: A large black flier (bat) bonded to Gregor. He is brave and much stronger than the average bat. During the journey, he is a source of strength for the other quest members with his calm and resourcefulness.
 Luxa: The rebellious future queen of Regalia. During the period between Gregor and the Prophecy of Bane and Gregor and the Curse of the Warmbloods, she and her bond Aurora were trapped in the Jungle and became close friends with the nibbler colony there. It is that colony's request for help that motivated her, Aurora, Gregor, and Ares to begin their quest. She later makes the "Vow to the Dead" at the site of a nibbler mass execution, essentially pledging all her personal and political power to avenge the mice's deaths.
 Aurora: A golden bat bonded to Luxa. She is one of Ares's only friends. She tends to side with Luxa in arguments, particularly on the subject of the mice colonies, as they were great friends to her as well.
 Boots (Margaret): Boots is Gregor's two-year-old sister. She is known as "the princess" by the crawlers. She becomes fixated with an Underland children's song that is later determined to be one of Bartholomew of Sandwich's sinister prophecies in disguise.
 Hazard: Luxa's young halflander cousin. He gifted with languages, and also has unusual knowledge about life in the Jungle, which makes him a great asset to the quest group. He turns seven early in the novel. He and the young flier Thalia are very close friends. Hazard sustains a head wound immediately after the traveling party enters the Swag and is incapacitated for most of the trip.
 Thalia: A very young peach-colored female bat. She absolutely loves jokes, and the other quest members often try to get her to laugh when she is terrifies by the number of dangerous circumstances they encounter on their way back to Regalia. She dies in the eruption of "the Queen" volcano, because she is too slow to outfly the volcanic ash and too inexperienced to hold her breath while flying. Ares, who blames himself for being unable to carry her away fast enough, lays her to rest with some mice recently executed by rats.
 Howard: Luxa's capable older cousin, and a kind of older brother to her. Howard is training to become a doctor, and is remarkably tolerant towards other creatures, with the notable exception of shiners (whom he blames for the near-death of Luxa and Aurora).
 Nike: A black-and-white striped bat, the daughter of Queen Athena. She becomes close to Howard, who lost his bond Pandora during a previous quest. Like Howard, she also dislikes fireflies.
 Temp: A crawler and friend of Boots. He is not very good at speaking English (which leads many to look down on him somewhat), but he is patient and wise, and has finely tuned natural instincts which save the quest members several times.
 Ripred: A grizzled old rat, and a rager like Gregor. The questers find him trapped in a slick obsidian pit with his teeth locked together, a form of slow execution and torture ordered by the Bane. He journeys with them out of the Firelands and provides valuable insight into the gnawers' reasons for exterminating the nibblers.
 Cartesian: A nibbler from the Fount colony whom the questers encounter early on. He is the sole survivor of his colony and is both terribly injured and suffering from an acute stress reaction (or "shock"). During brief moments of lucidity, he reveals himself to be brave and intelligent, but he spends most of the trip delirious from pain medication.
 Photos Glow-Glow and Zap: Two hired fireflies who travel briefly with the quest members as a source of light, after their displaced colony is discovered in Hades Hall. They desert the group at the first sign of danger.

References

2006 American novels
American fantasy novels
Novels set in New York (state)
The Underland Chronicles
2006 children's books
American children's novels
Sequel novels
Fiction books about genocide